Cicada barbara is a species of cicada belonging to the family Cicadidae, subfamily Cicadinae and the genus Cicada.

Subspecies 
Cicada barbara lusitanica

References 

Cicadini
Hemiptera of Africa
Hemiptera of Europe
Insects of the Middle East
Insects described in 1866